HBO Europe is a premium television group of channels by HBO. It is available as a group of film channels and streaming television services in Hungary, Poland, the Czech Republic, Slovakia, Romania, Bulgaria, Croatia, Slovenia, Serbia, Montenegro, Bosnia and Herzegovina, North Macedonia and Moldova while VOD-only services with original programming is available in Spain, Sweden, Norway, Denmark, Finland and Portugal.

The administration of Central European countries and Portugal is headquartered in Budapest, Hungary; meanwhile the Nordic and Spain services operate from Stockholm, Sweden. HBO Europe has offices also in Prague, Belgrade, Bratislava, Bucharest, Zagreb, Lisbon, Madrid, Copenhagen, Helsinki, Sofia and Warsaw.

HBO Max has replaced HBO GO in Europe. It was launched in Hungary, the Czech Republic, Slovakia, Romania, Bulgaria, Croatia, Slovenia, Serbia, Montenegro, Bosnia and Herzegovina, North Macedonia, Moldova, Portugal and Poland on March 8, 2022, while in Spain, Norway, Denmark, Finland and Sweden, it was launched on October 26, 2021.

History
The first channel was launched in Hungary on September 28, 1991. This was followed by the launch in Czech Republic, founding HBO Europe's predecessor under the name HBO Central Europe. In 1995 Walt Disney entered in joint-venture, and in 1996 it was launched in Poland (1996), Slovakia (1997), Romania (1998), Moldova (1999), Bulgaria (2002), Croatia, Slovenia (2004), Serbia, Bosnia and Herzegovina, Montenegro (2006) and North Macedonia (2009).

In September, 2003 a new premium channel HBO2 was launched as the sister channel of HBO. In November, 2005, Cinemax and Cinemax2 stated to broadcast, while in September, 2007 a third channel named HBO Comedy was introduced as well.

Upon the launch of HBO in the Netherlands, HBO Central Europe was renamed HBO Europe in 2012. In 2011 HBO entered the market of streaming services with launching HBO Go's localized Central European version. Following HBO Go's launch, in 2012 HBO Nordic was launched in Sweden, Norway, Denmark and Finland, the first countries where HBO introduced only streaming services without any linear television channels. It was followed by the launch of HBO España in 2016 (the Dutch version was closed in the same year) and HBO Portugal in 2019, both of them being VOD-only services.

Brands

Television channels
HBO Europe owns premium film channels in its Central European operating area under the names HBO, HBO2, HBO3, Cinemax and Cinemax2. HBO serves as the flagship channel of the portfolio, while HBO2's programming consists of mainly family-friendly content. Former comedy channel HBO Comedy was rebranded in 2016 as HBO3, a premium channel focusing on television series. Cinemax serves as a mainstream cinema channel, while Cinemax2 offers art films.

All Sister Channels

|-
|
 HBO, more commonly known as HBO Europe Channel, was the first premium television channel in Europe.

 HBO 2, (stylized as HBO2) known as HBO Plus from 1998–2002, was the second premium television channel in Europe.

 HBO 3, (stylized as HBO3) also known as HBO Comedy from 2007–2016, was the third premium television channel in Europe.

 Cinemax, also known as Cinemax Europe Channel, was the first Europe premium television channel.

 Cinemax 2 (stylized as Cinemax2) was the second Europe premium television channel.

Currently operating channels

|-
| 
 HBO (Hungarian)
 HBO (Czech)
 HBO (Polish)
 HBO (Romanian)
 HBO (Adria - Croatian, Slovenian, Serbian, Bulgarian, Macedonian)
 HBO 2 (Hungarian, Czech, Romanian)
|
 HBO 2 (Polish)
 HBO 2 (Adria - Croatian, Slovenian, Serbian, Bulgarian, Macedonian)
 HBO 3 (Hungarian, Czech)
 HBO 3 (Polish)
 HBO 3 (Romanian)
 HBO 3 (Adria - Croatian, Slovenian, Serbian, Bulgarian, Macedonian)

Cinemax

|-
| 
 Cinemax (Hungarian, Czech, Romanian, Croatian, Slovenian, Serbian, Bulgarian, Macedonian)
 Cinemax (Polish)
| 
 Cinemax 2 (Hungarian, Czech, Romanian, Croatian, Slovenian, Serbian, Bulgarian, Macedonian)
 Cinemax 2 (Polish)

Streaming services
HBO Europe owns streaming services throughout Europe. It has been operating services branded as HBO Go in Central European countries since 2011. Localized subtitles are available in Hungarian, Czech, Romanian, Bulgarian, Croatian, Polish, Serbian, Slovak, Slovenian and Macedonian. Localized dubbing and voiceover feeds are available in Hungarian, Czech and Polish usually a week after an original series' episode premieres. HBO Go is the leading streaming service in all of the countries in which it operates - as of August, 2019, it has 5.5 million subscribers throughout Central Europe.  Its platform is developed in Budapest.

HBO was launched as a VOD-only brand in Sweden, Denmark, Norway and Finland as HBO Nordic and in Spain as HBO España. Meanwhile, HBO Go is developed in Budapest, Nordic and España services are headquartered in Stockholm.

On August 15, 2012, HBO announced plans to launch HBO Nordic, a multiplatform video distribution service serving Norway, Denmark, Sweden and Finland that was created through a joint venture with Parsifal International. The video on demand service launched in December 2012. HBO programming also airs in Iceland on Stöð 2. In Spain, HBO programs were previously broadcast on pay television service Canal+, since 2011. In 2016, during the discontinuation of the Canal+ branding in Spain, HBO launched a standalone streaming service called HBO España, which is the Spanish equivalent of HBO Now and HBO Nordic. HBO Europe had announced on multiple occasions that they were not aware that they were going to replace their current service with HBO Max, nor would their rates be increased. However, in December 2020, the head of HBO Max, Andy Forssell, revealed that all HBO services in Europe, including HBO España and HBO Nordic, would be replaced by HBO Max. On October 26, 2021, HBO Max was launched in the Nordics (excluding Iceland) and Spain.

In 2019, HBO's streaming service was also introduced in Portugal as HBO Portugal. Despite the fact that it is not branded as HBO Go, it uses the Central European platform.

In the 2010s, HBO Europe launched the streaming service HBO Go in 13 countries in Central and Eastern Europe. HBO programs in Portugal were previously broadcast on premium television channel TVSéries from the services of TVCine, since 2015. In 2019, less than a year before the discontinuation of TVSéries, HBO Europe launched a standalone streaming service called HBO Portugal. Similar to the Nordics and Spain, HBO Max was launched in Portugal and Central and Eastern Europe on March 8, 2022, replacing HBO Go and HBO Portugal.

Current programming

Foreign series

Original series
 Oz (1997–2003)
 Sex and the City (1998–2004)
 The Sopranos (1999–2007)
 Curb Your Enthusiasm (2000–2011, 2017–present)
 The Wire (2002–2008)
 True Blood (2008–2014)
 Boardwalk Empire (2010–2014)
 Strike Back (2010–2020)
 Game of Thrones (2011–2019)
 Girls (2012–2017)
 Veep (2012–2019)
 True Detective (2014–present)
 Silicon Valley (2014–2019)
 Ballers (2015–2019)
 Last Week Tonight with John Oliver (2016–present)
 High Maintenance (2016–2020)
 Westworld (2016–2022)
 Insecure (2016–2021)
 Crashing (2017–2019)
 Big Little Lies (2017–2019)
 The Deuce (2017–2019)
 Room 104 (2017–2020)
 Barry (2018–present)
 Succession (2018–present)
 2 Dope Queens (2018)
 Sally4Ever (2018)
 Euphoria (2019–present)
 The Righteous Gemstones (2019—present)
 His Dark Materials (2019—2022)
 Avenue 5 (2020—present)
 I May Destroy You (2020)
 Perry Mason (2020–present)
 Industry (2020—present)
 Lovecraft Country (2020)
 How To with John Wilson (2020–present)
 The Nevers (2021)
 The White Lotus (2021—present)
 The Gilded Age (2022—present)
 Winning Time: The Rise of the Lakers Dynasty (2022—present)
 House of the Dragon (2022—present)
 The Last of Us (2023—present)

Acquired series
 The Middle (2009–2018, ABC)
 Luther (2010–2019, BBC One)
 Modern Family (2011–2020, ABC)
 Ray Donovan (2013–2020, Showtime)
 Black Lake (2016–present, TV3)
 Berlin Station (2016–2019, Epix)
 Better Things (2016–2022, FX)
 The Good Fight (2017–2022, CBS All Access)
 SMILF (2017–2019, Showtime)
 Snowfall (2017–present, Showtime)
 Tin Star (2017–2020, Sky Atlantic)
 The Big Bang Theory (2017–2019, CBS)
 Young Sheldon (2017–present, CBS)
 Clique (2017–2018, BBC Three)
 Counterpart (2018–2019, Starz)
 Claws (2018–2022, TNT)
 Siren (2018–2020, Freeform)
 All American (2018–present, The CW)
 Escape at Dannemora (2018, Showtime)
 A Discovery of Witches (2018–2022, Sky One)
 Heathers (2018, Paramount Network)
 Legacies (2018–2022, The CW)
 Tell Me a Story (2018–2020, CBS All Access)
 Death and Nightingales (2019, BBC Two)
 Black Monday (2019–2021, Showtime)
 I Am the Night (2019, TNT)
 Miracle Workers (2019–present, TBS)
 Deadly Class (2019, SyFy)
 Roswell, New Mexico (2019–2022, The CW)
 Mao Mao: Heroes of Pure Heart (2020, Cartoon Network)
 Phineas and Ferb (2020–present, Disney Channel)
 Lazy Town (2020–present, Lazy Town Entertainment)

Movie library
HBO premieres movies after 8 months from theatrical release from the following studios:
 Columbia Pictures
 Paramount Pictures
 Warner Bros.
 Universal Studios

Original programming
HBO Europe is also one of the largest producer companies for television in Central and Eastern Europe, operating HBO Europe Original Programming Ltd., headquartered in London, producing several local original scripted programming and series based on licensed formats.

Licensed formats include BeTipul (Bez tajemnic, Terapie, Terápia), Small Time Gangster (Umbre), Mammon (Mamon, The Pact) and When Shall We Kiss? (Társas játék, Rămâi cu mine, Až po uši).

Croatia

Czech Republic

Hungary

Norway

Poland

Romania

Spain

Sweden

References

External links
 Official HBO Europe Website (Archived via Wayback Machine)

Europe
HBO Europe
Television channels in Poland
Television stations in the Czech Republic
Television channels in Slovakia
Television in Hungary
Television stations in Romania
Television networks in Bulgaria
Television channels in Slovenia
Television channels in North Macedonia
Television in Croatia
Television in Moldova
Television stations in Montenegro
Television stations in Serbia
Television channels and stations established in 1991
1991 establishments in Hungary